Azaera lophophora is a species of snout moth in the genus Azaera. It was described by Harrison Gray Dyar Jr. in 1912, and is known from Panama.

References

Moths described in 1914
Phycitinae
Moths of Central America